Garibaldi was a Mexican pop group, who wore a free version of the traditional charro costume while singing modern versions of traditional songs. Their dress and style of music caused controversy in their time. The name Garibaldi comes from Plaza Garibaldi in Mexico City where mariachi bands can be found. The group remained active from 1988 through 1994. The group was created by Mexican TV producer Luis de Llano Macedo during the celebration of the 175 years of Mexican Independence in the musical festival held in Acapulco, Guerrero.

Reunion

In 1999 the group reunited to record Reunion 10, in celebration of 10 years from their commencement. The group was dissolved months later after a mild reception from the public.

In 2010 the group reunited for a second time to record Garibaldi Bicentenario, in celebration of the 200 years of Mexican Independence. However two of the original members  abandoned the reunion project. At first Víctor Noriega did not appear in the production release citing work exhaustion due to the completion of a recent soap opera. Patricia Manterola followed citing other work commitments as the cause of her departure. The remaining six members did perform a tour throughout Mexico and USA including the celebration of the independence day at the Mandalay Bay hotel in Las Vegas on September 17, 2010.

Members
Original members, and their occupations:
 Sergio Mayer: Producer, Entrepreneur, Actor
 Víctor Noriega: Actor, singer
 Charly López: Actor, restaurant owner, Model, Producer. 
 Xavier Ortiz (+): Actor, Model, TV Host (died 2020)
 Patricia Manterola: Singer, Actress
 Pilar Montenegro: Singer, actress
 Luisa Fernanda: TV & radio host, actress
 Katia Llanos: Entrepreneur, TV host

Replacement members, and their current occupations are:

 Rafael Amaya: Actor, model, singer
 Íngrid Coronado: TV host, actress
 Rebeca Tamez: Beauty queen Nuestra Belleza México
 Paola Toyos: Actress 
 Alyn Chenillo: Actress
 Ana Saldivar: Actress
 Agustín Arana: Actor
 Stefano Bosco: Model

Films
1993: Dónde quedó la bolita

Discography
2010: Bicentenario
1999: Reunion 10
1998: Garibaldi XXI
1995: Miami Swing
1994: Caribe
1993: Gritos De Guerra, Gritos De Amor
1993: Dónde Quedó La Bolita (Original Soundtrack)
1991: Nochebuena
1991: Los Hijos De Buda
1990: Que Te La Pongo
1988: Garibaldi

References

External links
 
 Entry at imdb.com

Mexican pop music groups